Mohammed "Dino" Stuart (1945/1946 – 26 February 2023) was a Namibian politician who served as a member of the National Assembly of Namibia with the opposition Democratic Turnhalle Alliance.

Stuart died on 26 February 2023, at the age of 77.

References

1940s births
Year of birth missing
2023 deaths
Popular Democratic Movement politicians
Members of the National Assembly (Namibia)
People from Walvis Bay